The Sommers Ranch Headquarters Historic District is a historic ranch complex located southwest of Pinedale, Wyoming. The district includes 11 wooden buildings, including a homestead house, a bunkhouse, a barn, and various other farm buildings and outbuildings. Albert P. "Prof" Sommers founded the ranch in 1908. The ranch is still operational and serves as an example of the many ranches built in the upper Green River Valley.

The district was listed on the U.S. National Register of Historic Places on June 18, 2009. The listing was announced as the featured listing in the National Park Service's weekly list of June 26, 2009.

References

External links
 Sommers Ranch Headquarters Historic District at the Wyoming State Historic Preservation Office

Geography of Sublette County, Wyoming
Ranches on the National Register of Historic Places in Wyoming
Historic districts on the National Register of Historic Places in Wyoming
National Register of Historic Places in Sublette County, Wyoming